Buffalo Lake is a large lake in central Alberta.

The lake lies in the Red Deer River basin, and has a water surface of 93.5 km2 and a drainage area of 1,440 km2.

The recreational areas of Boss Hill, Rochon Sands, White Sands, Scenic Sands, Buffalo Sands. Pelican Point, Pelican View Estates (PVE), and The Narrows are established on the shores of the lake, as is the Rochon Sands Provincial Park.

Buffalo Lake is unique in Alberta in that it is actively "managed" via actively controlled inflow pumped in from the Red Deer River via Parlby Creek and outflow back into the Red Deer River via Tali Creek. Due to the lake's shallow and lack of natural outflows, its level would fluctuate more than other lakes so projects to manage the lakes water level were built and began operation in 1996.

The lake has three main bays: First is the larger Main Bay which is 6.5 meters at its deepest point and has two islands. Second is Secondary Bay which is smaller than main bay and has one large island which is privately owned. Last is Parlby Bay (also known as mirror bay) which Is a lot smaller than the other bays and has Parlby Creek flowing through it. The lake supports a decent amount of Northern Pike and Burbot. There is also another shallow bay at the most northern part of the lake called Jarvis Bay.

References

External links
Buffalo Lake Management Team
Buffalo Lake Intermunicipal Development Plan, Stettler

Camrose County
Lacombe County
Lakes of Alberta
County of Stettler No. 6